Stenilema quadrinotata is a moth in the subfamily Arctiinae. It was described by Sergius G. Kiriakoff in 1965. It is found in the Democratic Republic of the Congo.

References

Moths described in 1965
Lithosiini
Endemic fauna of the Democratic Republic of the Congo